Ōsawa Station is the name of two train stations in Japan:

 Ōsawa Station (Niigata) (大沢駅) in Niigata Prefecture
 Ōsawa Station (Yamagata) (大沢駅) in Yamagata Prefecture